is a Japanese actress and model.

Career
Ishibashi starred in Ryuichi Hiroki's Your Friend in 2008. She was given a Best New Talent award at the 2008 Yokohama Film Festival. She appeared in Koji Maeda's Cannonball Wedlock in 2011.

Filmography

Films
Your Friend (2008) as Emi Izumi
Akai Ito (2008) as Asami Tadokoro
Time Traveller: The Girl Who Leapt Through Time (2010) as young Kazuko Yoshiyama
Cannonball Wedlock (2011) as Mika
Paper Flower (2011) as Asuka
My Back Page (2011) as Shigeko
Milocrorze (2011) as Yuri
Yume no Kayoiji (2012) as Mari Miyazawa
The Millennial Rapture (2013) as Yukino
Fuan no Tane (2013) as Yoko
Heart Beat (2013) as Kayo
Girl in the Sunny Place (2013)
L DK (2014) as Satsuki Mizuno
My Pretend Girlfriend (2014)
Tremble All You Want (2017)
The Stand-In Thief (2017)
Memoirs of a Murderer (2017)
Linking Love (2017)
Color Me True (2018)
Butterfly Sleep (2018)
Hatsukoi Loss Time (2019)

Television
Akai Ito (TV series) (2008-2009) as Asami Tadokoro
Ohisama (2011)
Sherlock Holmes (2014) as Mary Morstan (voice)
Gunshi Kanbei (2014)
Hana Moyu (2015)
The Emperor's Cook (2015) as Mitsuko Takahama
Kenji Miyazawa's Table (2017) as Toshi Miyazawa

References

External links
 
 

1992 births
21st-century Japanese actresses
Japanese female models
Living people
Actors from Fukuoka Prefecture
Models from Fukuoka Prefecture